PANS can refer to:

Panin Sekuritas, ticker symbol for Indonesia Stock Exchange
Pediatric acute-onset neuropsychiatric syndrome
Parasympathetic nervous system (Parasympathetic Autonomic Nervous System)
PANS-OPS (Procedures for Air Navigation Services), ICAO)
 Peripheral autonomic nervous system
Positive and Negative Syndrome Scale